Harshita Saxena is the winner of Pantaloons Femina Miss India International 2009 title, after being crowned third runner-up at Pantaloons Femina Miss India 2009 in Mumbai on 5 April 2009. She represented India at Miss International 2009 on 28 November 2009 in Chengdu, Sichuan, China and did not make it as a semifinalist. She was also previously crowned Pantaloons Femina Miss India Earth 2008 in Mumbai on 5 April 2008, but surrendered her crown soon after because she breached her contract with Gladrags. She was replaced with Tanvi Vyas as the new Miss India Earth 2008. Harshita competed for the I AM She Miss India Universe 2010 title crowned on 28 May 2010 in Mumbai, where she did not place as a semifinalist.

Biography
Harshita Saxena was crowned Pantaloons Femina Miss India Earth 2008 in Mumbai on 5 April 2008. She had participated in the contest as a regional contestant in Goa and was selected for the main event in December 2007. She was allowed a direct entry to the Miss India 2008 finals on 5 April 2008 as a regional winner.

References

External links
 
 
 
 

Year of birth missing (living people)
Living people
Femina Miss India winners
Female models from Mumbai
Miss International 2009 delegates